Abay Chingizovich Bokoleyev (born 3 February 1996 in Bishkek) is a Kyrgyz professional footballer who plays as a forward for Dordoi Bishkek.

Career statistics

International

Statistics accurate as of match played 11 June 2021

Honours
Dordoi Bishkek
Kyrgyz Premier League (2): 2018, 2020
Kyrgyzstan Cup (1): 2018

References

External links

1996 births
Living people
Kyrgyzstani footballers
Kyrgyzstan international footballers
Association football forwards
FC Dordoi Bishkek players
FC Alga Bishkek players
TFF First League players
Kyrgyzstani expatriate footballers
Expatriate footballers in Turkey
Kyrgyzstani expatriate sportspeople in Turkey